Joseph Kirkland (born April 5, 1968), better known by his stage name Diamond D, is an American hip hop MC and record producer from The Bronx, New York City, and one of the founding members of the Diggin' in the Crates Crew, abbreviated as D.I.T.C.

Early years 
Growing up in Forest Houses in The Bronx, Diamond D was influenced by local DJs, DJ Hutch and DJ Supreme. During his youth the two DJs would let him perform on their turntables. At the beginning of his career as a producer, Diamond spent many hours at Jazzy Jay's studio on Allerton Avenue in The Bronx. He credits Jay for inspiring him to buy a sampler and teaching him various production techniques. In a 2017 interview he said, "I learned about 95% of my production skills from him. And he was ahead of his time."

Recording career 
In addition to Jazzy Jay's teachings, Diamond credited Brand Nubian member Grand Puba as his inspiration to start rapping. An early guest appearance on A Tribe Called Quest's The Low End Theory track "Show Business" helped make people more aware of him as an artist.

The following year he released his debut record Stunts, Blunts and Hip Hop. In a 2017 interview Diamond described the album as, "just a collection of beats and records I was just setting aside. It was more about, 'One day I want to do something with this' ideas. And about 80% of that album I got from those records."

Diamond's favorite experience from making Stunts, Blunts, and Hip Hop was recording the vocals for the song "Check One, Two." He credits producer The 45 King with clearing the samples for that beat. It took him 30 minutes to construct the beat one of the album's best-known tracks, "Sally Got A One Track Mind".

In 1996 Diamond won a Grammy Award for his production on the title track from The Fugees' The Score album. He later described the experience as "just a bad memory" and declined to talk about it in an interview.

To promote his 1997 sophomore record Hatred, Passions and Infidelity, Mercury Records compiled a promotional vinyl called Diamond Jewels that included the Stunts, Blunts, and Hip Hop songs "Best Kept Secret', "*!*! What U Heard", and "Sally Got A One Track Mind".

Discography

Albums

As featured artist

References

External links
 Myspace
DanishDox: BEAT DIGGIN´

African-American record producers
American hip hop record producers
African-American male rappers
Rappers from the Bronx
Five percenters
Diggin' in the Crates Crew members
Mercury Records artists
Underground rappers
Living people
1968 births
20th-century American rappers
21st-century American rappers
Record producers from New York (state)